Live at the Exposition Hall, Osaka, Japan is a live album by the British glam rock band Girl, originally recorded in 1982.

Track listing
"Wasted Youth" - 3:31
"Make It Medical" - 4:50
"My Number" - 3:33
"Heartbreak America" - 2:38
"Little Miss Ann" - 3:18
"Ice in the Blood" - 3:57
"Family at War" - 5:01
"Mad for It" - 4:53
"Tush" - 3:34 (ZZ Top cover)
"Old Dogs" - 3:22
"Strawberries" - 3:25
"Standard Romance" - 4:27
"Passing Clouds" - 5:17
"Nineteen" - 5:31
"Overnight Angels" - 4:53
"Hollywood Tease" - 3:07
"This Town" - 5:09

Personnel
Phil Lewis - lead vocals
Pete Bonas - guitar
Gerry Laffy - guitar
Simon Laffy - bass
Bryson Graham - drums

References 

Girl (band) albums
2001 live albums